East Lewistown is an unincorporated community in Mahoning County, in the U.S. state of Ohio.

History
East Lewistown was laid out in 1830. A post office called East Lewistown was established in 1850, and remained in operation until 1902.

References

Unincorporated communities in Mahoning County, Ohio
1830 establishments in Ohio
Populated places established in 1830
Unincorporated communities in Ohio